The 1872 New South Wales colonial election was held between 13 February and 28 March 1872. This election was for all of the 72 seats in the New South Wales Legislative Assembly and it was conducted in 52 single-member constituencies, six 2-member constituencies and two 4-member constituencies, all with a first past the post system. Suffrage was limited to adult white males. The previous parliament of New South Wales was dissolved on 3 February 1872 by the Governor, Lord Belmore, on the advice of the Premier, Sir James Martin.

There was no recognisable party structure at this election; instead the government was determined by a loose, shifting factional system.

Key dates

Results
{{Australian elections/Title row
| table style = float:right;clear:right;margin-left:1em;
| title        = New South Wales colonial election, 13 February 1872 – 28 March 1872
| house        = Legislative Assembly
| series       = New South Wales colonial election
| back         = 1869–70
| forward      = 1874–75
| enrolled     = 
| total_votes  = 91,784
| turnout %    = 48.44
| turnout chg  = −5.26
| informal     = 642
| informal %   = 1.00
| informal chg = +0.59
}}

|}

References

See also
 Members of the New South Wales Legislative Assembly, 1872–1874
 Candidates of the 1872 New South Wales colonial election

1872
1872 elections in Australia
1870s in New South Wales
February 1872 events
March 1872 events